This is a list of players of Cardiff City Football Club who have made between 1 and 25 appearances for the club. The club was founded in 1899 as Riverside A.F.C. by members of a local cricket club, before changing to Cardiff City in 1907. They made their debut in the FA Cup in 1912 and were elected into the Football League eight years later in 1920, moving into their new stadium Ninian Park.

Key

Players with name in italics were on loan from another club for the duration of their Cardiff career.
Club career is defined as the first and last calendar years in which the player appeared in competitive first-team football for the club.
Total appearances and goals comprise those in the Football Alliance, Premier League, Football League games, FA Cup, Football League Cup, FAW Cup, Play-offs, European Cup Winners' Cup, friendlies and war-time games are excluded.
Substitute appearances are included.
Statistics are correct as of 7 May 2022.

List

Footnotes
<div style="font-size:95%">
Player statistics include games played while on loan from:

  – Players have been loaned to Cardiff before moving permanently.
  Ian MacLean joined twice on loan in the same season from Bristol Rovers.

References

 1-24
Association football player non-biographical articles
Cardiff City F.C.